Neleucania is a genus of moths of the family Noctuidae.

Species
 Neleucania patricia (Grote, 1880)
 Neleucania praegracilis (Grote, 1877) (=Neleucania suavis (Barnes & McDunnough, 1912), Neleucania bicolorata (Grote, 1881), Neleucania niveicosta Smith, 1902, Neleucania citronella Smith, 1902)

References
Natural History Museum Lepidoptera genus database
Neleucania at funet

Hadeninae